Edwin Myers (5 July 1888 – 15 September 1916) was an English sportsman. He played eleven first-class cricket matches for Surrey between 1910 and 1914. He also played football for Northfleet and Crystal Palace. He was killed in action during World War I when serving as a corporal in the 21st Battalion (Surrey Rifles) of the London Regiment, on the opening day of the Battle of Flers–Courcelette.

See also
 List of Surrey County Cricket Club players
 List of cricketers who were killed during military service

References

External links
 

1888 births
1916 deaths
English cricketers
Surrey cricketers
Sportspeople from Kent
English footballers
Ebbsfleet United F.C. players
Crystal Palace F.C. players
Military personnel from London
London Regiment soldiers
British Army personnel of World War I
Association football outside forwards
British military personnel killed in the Battle of the Somme